Carissa Rodriguez (born 1970)  is an American artist who lives and works in New York City.

Artistic practice
Rodriguez' work investigates the relationship of the material and social conditions through which art is produced, reproduced, and consumed. Rodriquez works in a spectrum of materials from cinema to photography to sculpture. Often, her exhibitions present complex and at times personal narratives that investigate the dynamics in play between artist, audience, and institution. She was a core member of Reena Spaulings Fine Art, New York from 2004 to 2015.

Exhibitions

Solo exhibitions
Cherchez La Ghost -  New Jerseyy - Basel - 2009
Busque El Ghost - House of Gaga - Mexico City - 2010
Karma International - Art Basel Miami Beach - 2011
Carissa Rodriguez - Karma International - Zurich, Switzerland - 2012
La Collectionneuse - Front Desk Apparatus - New York, NY 2013
I'm normal. I have a garden. I’m a person.” - CCA Wattis Institute for Contemporary Arts - San Francisco, CA 2016 - curated by Jamie Stevens
The Maid - SculptureCenter - Long Island City, NY - Curated by Ruba Katrib- 2018

Group exhibitions
ProBio, MoMA PS1, New York, NY (2013)
Whitney Biennial, Whitney Museum, New York, NY (2014) - curated by Stuart Comer, Anthony Elms, and Michelle Grabner
Whitney Biennial, Whitney Museum, New York, NY (2019) - curated by Rujeko Hockley and Jane Panetta

Awards 
Foundation for Contemporary Arts - Grant to Artists - (2018)

References

External links
Carissa Rodriguez - ContemporaryArtDaily.com

Living people
21st-century American artists
1970 births

Eugene Lang College alumni